The Black Front was a Dutch Greater Netherlandic and Fascist movement active before the Second World War.

The Front grew out of the southern section of the General Dutch Fascist League, with regional organiser Arnold Meijer quarrelling with leader Jan Baars and leading his followers out in 1934. The Black Front emerged and soon took over a number of smaller movements, while also gaining some support among the poorer parts of society. Although similar to its parent movement, the Black Front emphasised a more Catholic line in tune with Meijer's own religious beliefs. Taking its cue in part from Italian fascism, it adopted that movement's black-shirted uniform while adding a unique emblem featuring a sword between a pair of ram horns.

However, the group struggled to gain support from the National Socialist Movement in the Netherlands (NSB); it was renamed the National Front in 1940. The National Front was ultimately banned by the Germans on 14 December 1941, along with all other Dutch political parties except for the NSB. The majority of its members switched to the NSB, although Meijer, disillusioned, left politics altogether.

References

Fascist parties in the Netherlands
Banned far-right parties